Oreochromis jipe, the Jipe tilapia, is a critically endangered species of cichlid fish native to Kenya and Tanzania, where it is restricted to Lake Jipe and the Pangani River. The population in the Pangani River (including Ruva River) shows some morphological differences compared to the population in Lake Jipe, and it is sometimes recognized as a separate species, the Pangani tilapia (O. pangani). Whether regarded as one or two species, the Jipe–Pangani tilapia forms a species flock with the threatened Lake Chala tilapia from the same general region of Kenya and Tanzania.

This species is important to local commercial fisheries.

References

jipe
Freshwater fish of Kenya
Freshwater fish of Tanzania
Critically endangered fish
Critically endangered fauna of Africa
Taxa named by Rosemary Lowe-McConnell
Fish described in 1955
Taxonomy articles created by Polbot